The 1936 Massachusetts gubernatorial election was held on November 3, 1936.

Democratic Governor James Michael Curley chose to run for United States Senate rather than seek a second term in office. Incumbent Democratic Treasurer Charles F. Hurley was elected Governor over former Republican State Treasurer John W. Haigis.

Democratic primary

Governor

Candidates
 Charles F. Hurley, Treasurer and Receiver-General of Massachusetts
 William McMasters, publicity agent and whistleblower in the Charles Ponzi case

Declined
 James Michael Curley, incumbent Governor (to run for U.S. Senate)

Results

Following his loss in the Democratic primary, McMasters accepted the nomination of the Union Party.

Lt. Governor

Candidates
Thomas F. Galvin, Lawrence City Alderman and Commissioner of Public Safety
Francis E. Kelly, former member of the Boston City Council and candidate for Lt. Governor in 1932 and 1934
Philip J. Philbin, special counsel for the United States Senate Committee on Education and Labor and ally of Senator David I. Walsh

Results

Republican primary

Governor

Candidates
John W. Haigis, former Treasurer and Receiver-General of Massachusetts

Results
Haigis was unopposed for the Republican nomination.

Lt. Governor

Candidates
Leverett Saltonstall, Speaker of the Massachusetts House of Representatives

Results
Speaker Saltonstall was unopposed for the Republican nomination.

General election

Candidates
John W. Haigis, former Treasurer and Receiver-General of Massachusetts (Republican)
Horace I. Hillis, candidate for Lt. Governor in 1934 (Socialist Labor)
Otis Archer Hood (Communist)
 Charles F. Hurley, Treasurer and Receiver-General of Massachusetts (Democratic)
Alfred Baker Lewis, attorney, civil rights activist, and perennial candidate (Socialist)
William McMasters, publicity agent and whistleblower in the Charles Ponzi case (Union)
Fred G. Bushold (Union-Coughlin-Townsend)

Results

See also
 1935–1936 Massachusetts legislature

References

Bibliography

Governor
1936
Massachusetts
November 1936 events